Horizon Colony is a Hutterite community and census-designated place (CDP) in Glacier County, Montana, United States.

Horizon Colony was first listed as a CDP prior to the 2020 census.

Demographics

References 

Census-designated places in Glacier County, Montana
Census-designated places in Montana
Hutterite communities in the United States